ServiceNow is an American software company based in Santa Clara, California that develops a cloud computing platform to help companies manage digital workflows for enterprise operations. Founded in 2003 by Fred Luddy, ServiceNow is listed on the New York Stock Exchange and is a constituent of the Russell 1000 Index and S&P 500 Index. In 2018, Forbes magazine named it number one on its list of the world's most innovative companies.

History
ServiceNow was founded as Glidesoft, Inc. in 2003 by Fred Luddy, and later incorporated in California in 2004. Luddy had previously served as chief technology officer for Peregrine Systems, an enterprise software company based in San Diego, until 2002. In founding the company, Luddy intended to provide the same services previously available from the then defunct Peregrine Systems.

Luddy was the only employee until mid-2005 when  in venture financing from JMI Equity allowed Glidesoft to hire five additional people. In 2006, the company changed its name to ServiceNow.

, the company had 275 employees in its San Diego, Chicago, New York, Atlanta, London and Frankfurt offices, as well as a partnership with Accenture who had more than 100 ServiceNow consultants. At this time, the company was sometimes known as "Service-now". By April 2011, the company had named Frank Slootman as chief executive officer.

In June 2012, ServiceNow became a publicly traded company following a  IPO. Shortly thereafter, the company relocated its headquarters from San Diego to Santa Clara, California. It was taken public by Morgan Stanley one month after they took Facebook public.

In October 2019, the company announced that CEO John Donahoe would be succeeded by Bill McDermott, formerly CEO of SAP SE at the end of the calendar year.

Acquisitions 

 In July 2013, ServiceNow acquired Mirror42, an Amsterdam-based software developer.
 In July 2014, ServiceNow acquired Neebula Systems, an Israeli cloud computing tools company.
 In February 2015, ServiceNow acquired Intréis.
 In June 2016, ServiceNow acquired Brightpoint Security.
 In January 2017, ServiceNow acquired machine learning startup DxContinuum.
 In October 2017, the company acquired the San Diego human-centered design firm Telepathy, which had been founded in 2001; the acquisition doubled the size of ServiceNow's internal design agency, the Design Experience Organization.
 In October 2017, ServiceNow acquired SkyGiraffe, an enterprise mobility company backed by Microsoft Ventures. SkyGiraffe was founded by Boaz Hecht and Itay Braun. SkyGiraffe formed the basis for ServiceNow's Mobile Platform released in March 2019.
 In April 2018 ServiceNow acquired VendorHawk, a software-as-a-service management company.
 In May 2018, ServiceNow acquired AI startup Parlo.
 In October 2018, ServiceNow acquired a data analytics company FriendlyData.
 In May 2019, ServiceNow acquired Appsee Ltd., an analytics startup, that helped developers understand how users interact with their mobile apps.
 In November 2019, ServiceNow announced its acquisition of Fairchild Resiliency Systems.
 In January 2020, ServiceNow announced its acquisition of Loom Systems, Passage AI and Attivio.
 In June 2020, ServiceNow announced its acquisition of Sweagle.
 In November 2020, ServiceNow announced its intent to acquire Element AI.
In March 2021, ServiceNow announced its acquisition of Intellibot.
In May 2021, ServiceNow announced its acquisition of Lightstep.
 In August 2021, ServiceNow announced its acquisition of Swarm64 and Mapwize.
 In October 2021, ServiceNow announced its acquisition of Gekkobrain.
 In June 2022, ServiceNow announced its acquisition of Hitch.

Business model
ServiceNow is a platform-as-a-service provider, providing technical management support, such as IT service management, to the IT operations of large corporations, including providing help desk functionality. The company's core business revolves around management of "incident, problem, and change" IT operational events.

In March 2020, ServiceNow released "Orlando", a version of its cloud software paired with artificial intelligence technology aimed at fixing practical problems.

See also
 IT service management
 DevOps
 BMC Software

References

External links
 
 

Software companies based in the San Francisco Bay Area
Companies based in Santa Clara, California
Cloud computing providers
Cloud applications
IT service management
Companies listed on the New York Stock Exchange
Software companies established in 2003
2003 establishments in California
2012 initial public offerings
American companies established in 2003
Software companies of the United States